Emma Whitelaw is an eminent molecular biologist and NHMRC Australia Fellow at the Queensland Institute of Medical Research and is among Australia's leading researchers of epigenetics. Whitelaw was the first to demonstrate epigenetic inheritance in mammals. She now currently works at La Trobe University in Australia.

Biography 

Whitelaw performed undergraduate studies at the Australian National University and obtained her D.Phil. from University of Oxford. She has worked for 15 years in London and Oxford, and since 1991 in Australia. She heads the Department of Population Studies and Human Genetics, dedicated to the study of epigenetics and mammalian gene expression, at Queensland Institute of Medical Research.

Work 

Whitelaw has worked extensively on the control of gene expression in higher eukaryotes. In 1999 Whitelaw, together with her co-workers made the first-ever demonstration of epigenetic inheritance in mammals.

Awards  
In 2008, Whitelaw was awarded a National Health and Medical Research Council  (NHMRC) Australia Fellowship and in 2011 she became a Fellow of the Australian Academy of Science. In 2011, she received the Jubilee Medal from the International Union of Biochemistry and Molecular Biology for work on the transgenerational inheritance of epigenetic marks.

References

External links 
 NGED Network Member Profile, with lists of grants and recent publications
 Epigenetics, Queensland Institute of Medical Research
 Fiona Wylie: Feature: Nature or Nurture? Neither!, LifeScientist, 29 December 2009

Living people
Year of birth missing (living people)
20th-century biologists
21st-century biologists
Australian molecular biologists
Australian National University alumni
Alumni of the University of Oxford
Women molecular biologists
Fellows of the Australian Academy of Science
Epigeneticists